Paxton & Whitfield are one of the oldest cheesemongers in England. Their main shop is located at 93 Jermyn Street, London.

History
Paxton & Whitfield were founded in 1797 but have roots going back to a market store in Aldwych in 1742. Originally located at 19 Jermyn Street, they moved to their current location in 1894.

Paxton & Whitfield hold two royal warrants, one from the Prince of Wales in 1997 and one from Queen Elizabeth II in 2001. The relationship with the Royal Warrant Holders Association goes back to Queen Victoria in 1850.

References

External links
Paxton & Whitfield website

British Royal Warrant holders
Shops in London
Cheese retailers
Food retailers of the United Kingdom
Dairy products companies of the United Kingdom